The ladies' 3 × 5 kilometre cross-country relay at the 1956 Winter Olympics was held on 1 February. Ten teams and thirty skiers participated in the event. Finland won the event. The Soviet team placed second and Sweden took the bronze.

Medalists

Source:

Results

* Difference is in minutes and seconds.

Source:

See also

 1956 Winter Olympics

Notes

References
 

Women's cross-country skiing at the 1956 Winter Olympics
Women's 4 × 5 kilometre relay cross-country skiing at the Winter Olympics
Cross
Oly